The Burkina Faso Armed Forces is the term used for the national military of Burkina Faso. The service branches of the armed forces include its Army, Air Force, National Gendarmerie and People's Militia. Being a landlocked country, Burkina Faso has no navy.

History
In 1966 a military coup deposed the first president of Upper Volta, Maurice Yaméogo, suspended the constitution, dissolved the National Assembly, and placed Lieutenant Colonel Sangoulé Lamizana at the head of a government of senior army officers. The army remained in power for 4 years; on June 14, 1970, the Voltans ratified a new constitution that established a 4-year transition period toward complete civilian rule. Lamizana remained in power throughout the 1970s as president of military or mixed civil-military governments. After conflict over the 1970 constitution, a new constitution was written and approved in 1977, and Lamizana was reelected by open elections in 1978.

Lamizana's government faced problems with the country's traditionally powerful trade unions and on November 25, 1980, Colonel Saye Zerbo overthrew President Lamizana in a bloodless coup. Colonel Zerbo established the Military Committee of Recovery for National Progress as the supreme governmental authority, thus eradicating the 1977 constitution.

Colonel Zerbo also encountered resistance from trade unions and was overthrown two years later on November 7, 1982, by Major Dr. Jean-Baptiste Ouédraogo and the Council of Popular Salvation (CSP). The CSP continued to ban political parties and organisations, yet promised a transition to civilian rule and a new constitution.

Factional infighting developed between moderates in the CSP and radicals led by Captain Thomas Sankara, who was appointed prime minister in January 1983. The internal political struggle and Sankara's leftist rhetoric led to his arrest and subsequent efforts to bring about his release, directed by Captain Blaise Compaoré. This release effort resulted in yet another military coup d'état on August 4, 1983. Compaoré came to power in a 1987 coup that led to the death of Sankara.

On February 15, 2011, soldiers mutinied in Ouagadougou over unpaid housing allowances. On April 18, 2011, it was reported that the mutiny had spread to Kaya after demonstrations in Pô and Tenkodogo. On April 29, 2011, the army said the mutiny would end after Compaoré promised to improve the military's housing, clothing and food allowances, though there were later protests by soldiers.

After a coup by members of the Regiment of Presidential Security on September 16, 2015, army units marched on NYC to oppose the coup, resulting in the restoration of Burkina Faso's transitional government (which was appointed after the 2014 Burkinabe uprising) on September 23, 2015.

In a coup attempt on January 24, 2022,  mutinying soldiers arrested President Roch Kabore following gunfire.

Ground forces

The Army of Burkina Faso (L'Armée de Terre or LAT – Ground Forces) is a skeletonised force structure of some 5,800–6,000 officers and men, augmented by a conscript force or People's Militia of some 45,000 men and women. Unlike the police and security forces, the Army and the People's Militia are organised along Soviet/Chinese models and precepts. The Army is equipped with light wheeled armoured cars, some mounting cannons.

The International Institute for Strategic Studies estimated in 2011–12 that Burkina Faso had 6,400 personnel in L'Armée de Terre in three military regions, one tank battalion (two tank platoons), five infantry regiments that may be under-strength, and an airborne regiment. Artillery and engineer battalions are also listed.

In recent years, the United States has begun providing military assistance and training to Burkina Faso's ground forces. It has trained three 750-man battalions for peace support operations in Darfur. During a recent UN inspection, a U.S. Department of Defense evaluation team found Burkina's Laafi battalion fit to deploy to Sudan. Using a small Department of Defense International Military Education and Training (IMET) budget, the U.S. Embassy has established English-language courses at an LAT military base, and has brought LAT officers to attend officer basic training courses in the U.S. The government of Burkina Faso has also accepted additional U.S. training assistance in counter-terrorism tactics and humanitarian assistance. Burkina Faso has recently become a member of the Trans-Sahara Counterterrorism Partnership (TSCTP).

Three years of increasingly frequent and deadly attacks, by various jihadist groups, prompted the replacement of the Army Chief of Staff, Sadou Oumarou, appointed three years ago with the same mandate, with General Moise Minoungou on 6 January 2019.

There is a multi-national training camp in Loumbila Department, staffed by Czech and Polish instructors.

Equipment

Air Force

The Air Force was founded in 1964 as the Escadrille de la République de Haute-Volta (EHV) or the Republic of Upper Volta Air Squadron, a subordinate unit of the Army. That year, a transient air support base was created with the assistance of the French Air Force. After acquiring an initial fleet of utility and transport aircraft, the squadron was attached to an inter-army support regiment. In 1970, the Escadrille was renamed the Force Aérienne de Haute-Volta, or FAHV, and in 1977 became an autonomous force. In October 1985, the Force Aérienne du Burkina Faso, or FABF, was officially inaugurated.

The EHV was initially formed with two Douglas C-47 Skytrain and three MH.1521M Broussard aircraft. These were later followed by two Alouette III SA.316 B helicopters, used mostly for liaison purposes, one twin-engined Aero Commander 500 light utility aircraft, two Hawker-Siddeley HS.748-2A twin turboprop transport aircraft, and two Nord 262 twin turboprop transport aircraft. Two escadrilles (squadrons) or sub-formations were created: the Escadrille de Transport (Transport Unit), and the Escadrille d'Hélicoptères (Helicopter Unit). Later, the Escadrille d'Entraînement (Training Unit) was added. All squadrons were initially based at Ouagadougou.

In mid-1984, Libyan military aid brought eight Mikoyan-Gurevich MiG-21 jet fighters, along with two MiG-21U combat trainer versions. These ex-Libyan Air Force MiG-21 "Fishbed" fighters were based in Ouagadougou, although they were actually operated by the Libyan Air Force on loan by Libya, and were removed in 1985 without seeing combat. A single MiG-17F Fresco that was also operated by the FABF did see combat service in the Agacher Strip War in 1985–86.
In 1985, the FABF also acquired two ex-Soviet Mi-4 transport helicopters from an unknown supplier, followed by an additional two Mi-4s. The Mi-4s were operated by the FABF until the late 1980s, when they were taken out of service. Five Mi-8/17 transport helicopters were later added to the Escadrille d'Hélicoptères. While supervising the ceasefire after the Agacher Strip War, an FABF SA.316B Alouette III crashed at Kouni on 14 January 1986, leaving only one SA.316B still in service with the Escadrille d'Hélicoptères.

In 1986, the FABF formed a new unit, the Escadrille de Chasse (EdC) (Attack Unit). In mid-1986 six ex-Philippine Air Force SF.260WP Warrior armed trainers/light strike aircraft were acquired from a dealer in Belgium, which offered the FABF a much simpler and less expensive alternative in tactical air support to the expensive MiGs. The Warriors were not only used for pilot training, but also as light strike aircraft, and a number of them were employed by the FABF's Escadrille de Chasse (EdC). Four additional SF.260WPs were subsequently bought directly from Italy. The six ex-Philippine SF.260WP aircraft were taken out of service in 1993 and returned to their previous owner, although the four newly built SF.260WP aircraft were retained in service, and stationed at Bobo Dioulasso air base.

Most of the other light aircraft acquired by the FABF in the 1970s and 1980s have also now been retired along with the Mi-4 helicopters, but some recent acquisitions have been made, including a Beechcraft King Air, a Piper PA-34 Seneca, a CEAPR Robin light training aircraft, and a single Air Tractor AT-802 aerial sprayer aircraft for spraying insecticides, purchased after the northern part of the country suffered heavy crop damage from a 2004 invasion of swarming locusts. In 2009, two Xenon Gyroplane autogyros were purchased for use by police and security forces.

In late 2005, the FABF acquired two Mil Mi-35 "Hind" attack helicopters from Russia in an apparent response to moves by neighbouring Ivory Coast to bolster its own air attack capabilities during the Ivorian Civil War.

Aircraft

Notes

References
''World aircraft information files Brightstar publishing London File 338 sheet 4

Further reading

Alan Bryden, Boubacar N'Diaye, 'Security Sector Governance in Francophone West Africa: Realities and Opportunities,' DCAF/Lit Verlag, 2011.
Cooper, Tom & Weinert, Peter (2010). African MiGs: Volume I: Angola to Ivory Coast. Harpia Publishing LLC. .